The 1928 Major League Baseball season was contested from April 10 to October 14, 1928. The St. Louis Cardinals and New York Yankees were the regular season champions of the National League and American League, respectively. The Yankees then defeated the Cardinals in the World Series, four games to none.

This was the seventh of eight seasons that "League Awards", a precursor to the Major League Baseball Most Valuable Player Award (introduced in 1931), were issued.

Awards and honors
League Award
 Mickey Cochrane, Philadelphia Athletics, C
 Jim Bottomley, St. Louis Cardinals, 1B

Statistical leaders

Standings

American League

National League

Postseason

Bracket

Managers

American League

National League

Home Field Attendance

References

External links
1928 Major League Baseball season schedule at Baseball Reference

 
Major League Baseball seasons